Juan Pablo Maricich Garcia (born January 23, 1972) is an Argentine slalom canoer who competed in the early 1990s. He finished 37th in the K-1 event at the 1992 Summer Olympics in Barcelona.

References
Sports-Reference.com profile

External links

1972 births
Argentine male canoeists
Canoeists at the 1992 Summer Olympics
Living people
Olympic canoeists of Argentina
Place of birth missing (living people)